Below is a list which presents and describes of the coat of arms of the Nobility of the First French Empire in France between 1804 and 1814, and 1815.

Note: all information is from each respective coat of arms' pages regarding their description, correct positions, etc.

Emperor of the French

Empresses

House of Bonaparte

Grand Dignitaries 
Initially under the Constitution of the Year XII (1804), six Dignitaries of the Empire (Grandes Dignités de l'Empire) were created:

 Archchancellor of the Empire
 Archchancellor of State of the Empire
 Arch-Treasurer of the Empire
 Grand Elector of the Empire
 Constable of the Empire
 Grand Admiral of the Empire

The following grand dignitaries were later added:

 Vice Grand Elector of the Empire (1807)
 Vice Constable of the Empire (1807)
 Governor General of the Alps Departments (1809)
 Grand Duchess of Tuscany (1809)
 Governor General of the Dutch Departments (1810)

Marshals of the Empire

Noble Titles of the Empire

Princes of the Empire

Dukes of the Empire

Counts of the Empire

Barons of the Empire

Chevaliers of the Empire

Commune Amorial 
During the Napoleonic Wars, several regions were integrated into 'Metropolitan France', becoming départements.  These are listed separately.

Footnotes

Notes

Citations

References 

 L'Almanach impérial pour l'année 1810
 M. L. Sandret, Revue Historique, BiblioBazaar, 2008(ISBN 978-0-559-53658-8, available online)
 Albert Révérend, Armorial du Premier Empire : titres, majorats et armoiries concédés par Napoléon Ier, Picard, 1894
 J.-F. Jules Pautet Du Parois, Paris, à la librairie encyclopédique de Roret, 1854, 340 p. (lire en ligne [archive]) ;
 Jacques Jourquin, Dictionnaires des Maréchaux de Napoléon, Christian, 1999
 Jacques Jourquin, Dictionnaire des maréchaux du Premier Empire, 1986
 Thierry Lentz, Dictionnaires des Ministres de Napoléon, Christian, 1999
 Quintin, Dictionnaire des Colonels de Napoléon, SPM, 1996
 Raoul de Warren, Les Pairs de France au XIXe siècle, les Cahiers nobles, 1959 (Réed. en 1999 par l'Intermédiaire des chercheurs et des curieux) ;
 Philippe Lamarque, Armorial du Premier Empire, Édition du Gui, 2008,  ;
 Armorial des Chevaliers de l'Ordre de la Réunion - par M. Alcide Georgel (1869) ;
 Armorial de l'Empire français (L'Institut. - L'Université. - Les écoles publiques) - par M. Alcide Georgel (1870) ;
 Armorial de l'Empire français  (Médecins et chirurgiens) - par M. Alcide Georgel (1869) ;

First French Empire
Nobility of the First French Empire
Marshals of France